Asghar Sadri (born 2 October 1957) is a former Iranian football player.

Playing career
He started playing at youth level for Rah Ahan F.C., then at senior level for Bargh Shiraz F.C. and Shahbaz. In 1979, at age of 22 moved to Germany to study architecture. Whilst in Europe he started his European football career with Dutch outfit MVV Maastricht which was then followed by a decade playing for clubs in Belgium.

International career
He was a member of the Iran national under-20 football team at 1977 FIFA World Youth Championship. He was a member of Iran national football team at qualifications for 1976 AFC Asian Cup and 1978 FIFA World Cup.

References

1957 births
Living people
Iranian footballers
Iran international footballers
Iranian football managers
Iranian expatriate footballers
Rah Ahan players
Bargh Shiraz players
MVV Maastricht players
K.V.C. Westerlo players
Place of birth missing (living people)
K.F.C. Diest players
Association football defenders